Murder Diary is a Hong Kong crime thriller produced by Television Broadcasts Limited (TVB), starring Kara Wai, Vincent Wong, Philip Keung, Benjamin Yuen, Mandy Wong, Lai Lok-yi and Venus Wong as the main cast.

The drama first premiered on Youku, myTV Gold, TVB Anywhere, and Astro GO at 8:00 pm on 15 June 2021. It premiered 9:30 pm on TVB Jade and Astro AOD on 28 June and will air 10:15 pm starting from 19 July due to the Tokyo Olympic Games broadcast.

Synopsis
Years ago, Yeung Bik-sum (Kara Wai), who suffered from schizophrenia, almost killed her son, Ip King-fung (Vincent Wong), and her daughter, Ip Long-ching (Joey Thye). This caused King-fung to suffer from Dissociative Identity Disorder. His split personality, Chu Kei (Vincent Wong), studied hard to be a handwriting expert and criminal profiler, who helped King-fung, an undercover agent, to uproot a criminal organisation.

Due to a series of complicated case, Chief Inspector of Police Kong Ching-fun (Lai Lok-yi) invited King-fung, psychiatrist Wai Yui-kit (Benjamin Yuen), bomb disposal officer Yau Ngan-sing (Mandy Wong) and forensic anthropologist Fong Yuen-chin (Venus Wong) to the Special Crime Unit. After being cured from Bipolar Disorder, Superintendent Nip Shan (Philip Keung) returned to lead the Special Crime Unit. Meanwhile, he found out that Bik-sum is linked to his wife Leung Yat-sze's (Alice Chan) disappearance...

Cast and Characters

Special Crime Unit

Ip family

Nip family

Other cast
Hana Kuk as Hoi Nam (海藍), an editor of a fiction website.
Shiga Lin as Cheung Hiu-man (張曉蔓), a forensic entomologist.

Production
A blessing ceremony was held on 3 June 2020. Filming lasted from May to August 2020.

Reception 
The series was mostly praised in mainland China for its unconventional and unique plot. The cast, particularly Kara Wai, was highly praised for her acting. The series currently has a fair rating of 7.4 on Douban. It reached the top ten trending dramas in China, which is considered rare for Hong Kong dramas especially in recent years.

However, Hong Kong viewers found the plot to be too confusing and difficult to follow. For TVB's live broadcast, the series is rated the lowest of the year in viewership with its first week averaging 17.5 points, which was its highest, and its second week averaging 15.5 points. Early online streaming on several platforms may have had an impact on its ratings. Airing at a later time due to the 2021 Olympic Games, the series dipped to its lowest rating of 10.2 points, averaging 13.8 points overall, one of the lowest dramas in TVB's 54-year history. Despite this, actor Vincent Wong thanked fans on social media for their support for the series.

Sequel 
On 14 March 2022, TVB confirmed that a sequel, Murder Diary Series 2, is in the works. It was announced as 1 of 4 sequels and 1 of 14 dramas in the pre-production stage at the FilMart marketing event.

References

Hong Kong crime thriller films